Namivand, also rendered as Namvand, may refer to:
 Namivand-e Olya
 Namivand-e Sofla
 Namivand-e Vasat